Geosporobacter subterraneus is a Gram-positive, chemoorganotrophic, spore-forming, strictly anaerobic, and non-motile bacterium from the genus of Geosporobacter which has been isolated from water from the Paris Basin.

References

Clostridiaceae
Bacteria described in 2007
Bacillota